Rhubarb tart is a tart filled with rhubarb.

Mrs Beeton's recipe requires half a pound of puff pastry, five large sticks of rhubarb and quarter of a pound of sugar with a little lemon juice and lemon zest to taste.  This is baked for 30 to 45 minutes and serves five people at a cost of ninepence.

Rhubarb was used medicinally as a purgative and this caused it to have unpleasant associations.  To make the dish more acceptable, rhubarb tart was sometimes renamed Spring apples in the 19th century.

In the arts
Rhubarb tart was celebrated in the radio show I'm Sorry I'll Read That Again in which it was a running joke.  Examples included the pun Rhubarb Tart of Omar Khayyam (Rubaiyat of Omar Khayyam) and The Rhubarb Tart Song which went:
...
A rhubarb what?  A rhubarb tart!
A whatbarb tart? A rhubarb tart!
I want another slice of rhubarb tart!
...

Notable consumers
 Friedrich Ludwig Georg von Raumer, who wrote in his account of England that he was a "very industrious eater of rhubarb tart".

References

Tarts
Rhubarb